The Puthimari River rises in Assam, India. It is a tributary of the Brahmaputra River, the fourth largest in the world. The Puthimari is known for its floods and high sediment load.

References 

Rivers of Assam
Rivers of India